The Western Regional Climate Center (WRCC) is a climate research center serving the Western United States. The WRCC is one of six regional centers administered by the National Oceanic and Atmospheric Administration and National Centers for Environmental Information, and partners with the Nevada-based Desert Research Institute.

The WRCC was established in 1986 and is based in Reno, Nevada.

See also

National Climatic Data Center

References

External links

National Oceanic and Atmospheric Administration
Reno, Nevada
1986 establishments in Nevada